Arab Labor (Avoda Aravit; , Shughl Arab) is an Israeli sitcom television series, created by Sayed Kashua.

History
The series premiered on Keshet Channel 2 in Israel in 2007. The second season was broadcast in 2008 and the third season in 2012. The series, whose title in colloquial Hebrew carries the implication of "shoddy or second-rate work", focuses on the family and work situations of Amjad, an Arab-Israeli journalist. Much of the comedy is derived from the paradox of Amjad's love-hate relationship with his Arab identity and his simultaneous wish to integrate comfortably into Israeli society.

Poking fun at the cultural divide, Kashua's characters play on religious, cultural and political differences to depict the mixed society prevalent in Israel.

In the United States, the program aired nationally on Link TV. It also appeared on KCET in Los Angeles in 2014.

The show has won two consecutive Awards of the Israeli Television Academy for Best Comedy Series.

Cast
Amjad (Norman Issa) – An Arab-Israeli journalist working in Jerusalem
Meir (Mariano Idelman) – photojournalist, Amjad's Jewish-Israeli coworker at the magazine
Bushra (Clara Khoury) – Amjad's wife
Amal (Mira Awad) – An Arab-Israeli attorney to whom Meir is attracted
Ismael, Abu Amjad (Salim Dau) – Amjad's father
Umm Amjad (Salwa Nakra -Seasons 1-3), (Alham Araff - Season 4)) – Amjad's mother
Maya (Fatma Yihye) – Amjad and Bushra's daughter
Natan (Dov Navon) and Timna (Rona Lipaz-Michael) - Joined in Season 2, neighbors of Amjad and Bushra
Yoske (Aryeh Moskona) and Yocheved (Sandra Sade) - Seasons 2 and 3 only, neighbors of Amjad and Bushra
Ami Schuster (Menashe Noy) - Joined in Season 3, Amjad's agent

Reception
The Chicago Tribune described it as "... a groundbreaking TV show that finds humor in sharing a homeland." The New York Times commented, "Kashua has managed to barge through cultural barriers and bring an Arab point of view ... into the mainstream of Israeli entertainment."

Reviews

See also
Television in Israel
Arab-Israeli peace projects

References

External links
 LinkTV website
 Full episodes at makoTV
Israeli-Arab sitcom Arab Labor becomes big hit
 

Israeli television series
Israeli television sitcoms
2007 Israeli television series debuts
Channel 2 (Israeli TV channel) original programming